District 7 is a district in the Texas House of Representatives that encompasses of Upshur County and Gregg County.

The district is currently represented by Republican Jay Dean.

References 

Gregg County, Texas
Upshur County, Texas